Joe Zemaitis is a former professional triathlete from the United States. In 1998, he became the youngest person to complete the Ironman Triathlon in under 10 hours.  In 2005, he won the USA Triathlon Pro/Elite Rookie of the Year.

Early years
Zemaitis graduated from Lake Forest College in 2002.

References

Year of birth missing (living people)
Living people
American male triathletes
Lake Forest College alumni